Missulena melissae is a species of mygalomorph spiders in the family Actinopodidae. It is found in Western Australia. Its type locality is in Millstream Chichester National Park, 6 km N. of Millstream Homestead.

References

melissae
Spiders described in 2014